Bradley is a village and civil parish in North East Lincolnshire, England. Its population recorded in the census for both 2001 and 2011 was 198.

Bradley Grade II* listed Anglican parish church is dedicated to St. George. Originating in the 12th century, it is of partly Norman origin. Restoration of the chancel and installation of electric lighting took place in 1928. The parish register dates from 1664. In the early 1930s, there existed a small Methodist chapel. Parish occupations included four farmers, a poultry farmer, and a fruit grower.

To the south of the village, within the parish boundary, are Bradley Woods (allegedly haunted) and Dixon Woods which together form a Local Nature Reserve. To the east, within the Grimsby boundary, lies the Bradley Recreation Ground and beyond that the Bradley Park Estate. The land on which these stand was part of  Bradley parish until 1928.

References

External links

"Bradley", Genuki.org.uk; retrieved 1 July 2011
"Parish of Great and Little Coates with Bradley". Retrieved 4 August 2013
Bradley Parish Council Website - http://www.bradleyvillagecouncil.org.uk

Villages in Lincolnshire
Borough of North East Lincolnshire
Civil parishes in Lincolnshire